Christopher Gary Williams (born 20 March 1959) is an English-born golfer who currently lives in South Africa. Williams has won seven times on the Sunshine Tour.

Professional career 
Williams was born in Liverpool, England. He moved to Johannesburg, South Africa shortly before turning professional in 1978. He joined the Sunshine Tour in 1985, and won his first title; the Lexington PGA Championship, during his debut season. He has won six more events on the Sunshine Tour since then.

Williams joined the European Senior Tour on turning 50, having secured conditional playing rights at the 2008 qualifying school. He won for the first time as a senior in March 2011 at the Aberdeen Brunei Senior Masters.

Amateur wins
1977/78 Junior Springbok

Professional wins (17)

Asian Tour wins (2)

Asian Tour playoff record (1–0)

Sunshine Tour wins (7)

Other wins (5)
 1983 Telkom Open (South Africa)
 1985 Swaziland Open
 1991 PX Celebrity Pro-Am (with Justin Hobday), Telephone Manufacturers SA Trophy
 2007 Royal Swazi Sun Touring Pro-Am (non-Order of Merit event on the Sunshine Tour)

European Senior Tour wins (3)

European Senior Tour playoff record (1–0)

References

External links

English male golfers
South African male golfers
Sunshine Tour golfers
Asian Tour golfers
European Tour golfers
European Senior Tour golfers
PGA Tour Champions golfers
People from Bebington
People from Edenvale, Gauteng
1959 births
Living people